Ealdbert or Ealdberht (died 725) was an Aetheling and rebel. After being expelled by Ine of Wessex, to Surrey and Sussex, he was killed by him.

References

External links 
 ; possibly also 

Anglo-Saxon royalty
Anglo-Saxon warriors
725 deaths
Year of birth unknown